Mark Everton Walters (born 2 June 1964) is an English former professional footballer who made 600 league appearances between 1981 and 2002.

A midfielder, Walters played top-flight football for Aston Villa, Liverpool and Southampton in England and for Rangers in Scotland, and played in the lower divisions of the Football League for Stoke City, Wolverhampton Wanderers, Swindon Town and Bristol Rovers. He was capped once by England.

Club career

Aston Villa
Walters began his career as an apprentice at Aston Villa on leaving school in the summer of 1980, turning the professional a year later – just after Villa's Football League First Division title triumph – and made his competitive debut on 28 April 1982 in a 4–1 league defeat at home to Leeds United, two months after the departure of manager Ron Saunders – who had given Walters his first professional contract – and the promotion of assistant Tony Barton to the manager's seat. Walters was not included in Villa's squad for the final of the European Cup on 26 May 1982, which they won 1–0 against Bayern Munich, the West German champions. Walters, still only 18, made 22 league appearances in the 1982–83 campaign as Villa finished sixth. He scored once that season. He was firmly established as a regular player in the 1983–84 season, appearing 37 times in the league and scoring eight goals, though Villa had a disappointing season and finished 10th, with Tony Barton being sacked at the end of the season and replaced by Graham Turner.

Walters, now highly rated as one of the country's most promising young players, remained in favour under Graham Turner, but Villa were in deep trouble throughout the 1985–86 season, finishing 16th and only avoiding relegation thanks to a late run of good form. Walters was restricted to 21 league games due to injury problems in 1986–87 as Villa were relegated in bottom place. Turner had been sacked in September and replaced by Billy McNeill, who in turn lost his job after relegation to be succeeded by Graham Taylor. Walters appeared in the first 24 games of Villa's ultimately successful quest to regain First Division status, scoring seven goals.

Rangers
During the late 1980s, Scottish club Rangers signed several English players, including internationals Terry Butcher, Trevor Steven, Gary Stevens, Chris Woods and Ray Wilkins. English clubs were banned from European competition, which meant that Rangers, who were managed by former Liverpool star Graeme Souness, were finding it easier to attract English players. Walters moved to Rangers for £500,000 on New Year's Eve 1987. Previously, black players had been a rarity in Scottish football. Queen's Park and Hearts had black players in the 19th Century and Gil Heron played for Celtic in 1951. Rangers had also previously signed a black player, Walter Tull, but he died during the First World War before he could appear for Rangers.

Walters made his Rangers debut on 2 January 1988 in the Old Firm derby match with Celtic at Parkhead, a game which Rangers lost 2–0. The Celtic support subjected Walters to monkey noises and the throwing of bananas and other fruit. Rangers banned one of their own supporters after an incident during Walters' home debut. Walters himself later stated that his worst experience in Scotland was at Heart of Midlothian's Tynecastle, where the abuse was compounded by object-throwing. The abuse at Tynecastle was widely covered in the Scottish media, with commentator Archie Macpherson criticising it during the highlights package on Sportscene. Hearts chairman Wallace Mercer apologised to Walters.

Whilst at Ibrox, Walters was part of the side that won the Scottish Premier Division in 1989, 1990 and 1991 and the Scottish League Cup in 1988 and 1990, thus enjoying the most successful spell of his career in terms of trophies won.

Liverpool
Liverpool paid £1.25 million for Walters' services and he made his debut four days after signing, when he came on as a 65th-minute substitute for Steve McMahon in a 2–1 league win over Oldham Athletic at Anfield on 17 August 1991. His first goal for the club was an 88th-minute penalty in a 2–1 league win over Notts County at Meadow Lane on 7 September 1991.

His best display all season was in a match against Auxerre at Anfield in the Uefa Cup. Liverpool trailed 2–0 from the away leg but won their home match 3–0 with Walters netting a late winner after tormenting the French defence all night long. He remained a regular in the side and helped Liverpool to the 1992 FA Cup Final, although he was an unused substitute as his teammates beat 2nd Division Sunderland 2–0. However, he appeared in just 25 out of 42 league appearances for the Reds that season, scoring three goals as they finished sixth – the first time since 1981 that they had finished lower than champions or runners-up.

Walters scored Liverpool's first FA Premier League goal when he equalised in a 2–1 win over Sheffield United in August 1992. That same season he was also the first Liverpool player to score a Premiership hat-trick in a 4–0 win over Coventry City. He was their second highest scorer behind Ian Rush that season, scoring 11 goals in 34 league games, though the Reds finished sixth again. He lost his regular place in central midfield to youngster Jamie Redknapp in the 1993–94 season and never regained it. When Liverpool beat Bolton Wanderers 2–1 in the 1995 League Cup final, again an unused substitute, Walters was being used less as Roy Evans was employing three centre-halves with Rob Jones and Stig Inge Bjørnebye as wing-backs and three midfielders – Steve McManaman, Jamie Redknapp and John Barnes.

He had already been sent out on loan to Stoke City (9 games, 2 goals) and Wolverhampton Wanderers (11 games, 3 goals) during the 1993–94 and 1994–95 seasons, and thus it was not surprising that, after not appearing at all during the first half of the 1995–96 season, Walters was allowed to leave, joining Southampton on 18 January 1996 on a free transfer.

Southampton
Walters was signed by David Merrington in January 1996 to assist in the Saints' desperate fight against relegation from the Premiership. He made his debut as a substitute against Middlesbrough on 20 January 1996 and made a total of five league and four FA Cup appearances (with the Saints reaching the quarter-finals of the competition), but struggled to make any real impression with the side. His final appearance was in a dreadful match away to Queens Park Rangers, which Saints lost 3–0 meekly surrendering in a shoddy second half. At the end of the season, with Saints' Premiership status secured for another season, Walters was released, moving on to Swindon Town, as Graeme Souness – the man who signed him for Liverpool five years earlier – was arriving at Southampton to succeed the sacked Merrington.

Swindon Town
Walters joined Swindon Town on a free on 31 July 1996 and made his debut on 17 August in the 2–0 defeat to Norwich City at Carrow Road. His first goal for the Robins came via a 26th-minute penalty during the 2–1 league win over Tranmere Rovers on 14 September 1996.

At the County Ground, Walters was "sometimes brilliant, but at other times could be very frustrating". He never really featured in manager Jimmy Quinn's plans, and was eventually released to Bristol Rovers on a free transfer during the administration period, when it was decided Town could no longer afford his wages. Walters played a total of 126 matches for Swindon in which he scored 28 goals before he was released on 17 November 1999.

Bristol Rovers
Having been told that he was no longer required by Swindon the 35-year-old joined Ian Holloway's Bristol Rovers side on a free transfer. He spent three years at the Memorial Stadium playing 96 times and scoring 14 goals before he finally retired on 26 April 2002, five weeks before his 38th birthday. The penultimate season of his career saw Rovers slip into Division Three, and they struggled at this level too, finishing the season just one place – though many points – above relegated Halifax Town.

England career
Walters represented England at schoolboy and under 21 levels before he earning his only full cap under Graham Taylor whilst he was with Rangers. It came on 3 June 1991 in the 1–0 friendly victory over New Zealand in Auckland.

Coaching and media
Walters joined Coventry Preparatory School as a Saturday morning football coach for the four- to 11-year–olds in February 2003; he then became a member of staff in January 2006, coaching years three to eight and is also head coach of the under-14s at Aston Villa's academy. Walters is also heavily involved with groups aiming to eliminate racism in football. Walters went back to school and obtained teaching qualifications. He is Head of Languages at Aston Villa's academy.

Although now retired, Walters still plays in the Sky Sports masters football competitions for Rangers. He is also one of three honorary members of the Rangers Supporters Trust, along with Johnny Hubbard and Billy Simpson.

In 2021 Walters presented the documentary Mark Walters in the Footsteps on Andrew Watson which was aired on BBC Scotland.

Personal life
Walters was born in Birmingham to the Nigerian footballer Lawrence Wabara, and a Jamaican mother who moved to England as part of the Windrush generation. His father walked out of the family when Mark was a child, and Walters was mostly raised by his mother, whose last name he uses. Walters is the half-brother of the professional boxer Pelé Reid, and the uncle of fellow footballers Simon Ford, and Reece Wabara.

Career statistics

Club
Source:

A.  The "Other" column constitutes appearances and goals in the European Cup, FA Charity Shield, Football League Trophy, Full Members Cup and UEFA Cup Winners' Cup, UEFA Cup.

International
Source:

Honours
Aston Yilla Youth
 FA Youth Cup: 1979–80 

Aston Villa
 UEFA Super Cup: 1982
 Football League Second Division runner-up: 1987–88

Rangers
 Scottish Premier Division: 1988–89, 1989–90, 1990–91
 Scottish League Cup: 1988–89, 1990–91; runner-up: 1989–90
 Scottish Cup runner-up: 1988–89

Liverpool
 FA Cup: 1991–92
 Football League Cup: 1994–95
 FA Charity Shield runner-up: 1992

References

External links
 Player profile at LFChistory.net
 
 Mark Walters index at Sporting-heroes.net

1964 births
Living people
Footballers from Birmingham, West Midlands
English footballers
England international footballers
England B international footballers
England under-21 international footballers
English sportspeople of Jamaican descent
English sportspeople of Nigerian descent
Aston Villa F.C. players
Rangers F.C. players
Liverpool F.C. players
Stoke City F.C. players
Wolverhampton Wanderers F.C. players
Southampton F.C. players
Swindon Town F.C. players
Bristol Rovers F.C. players
Premier League players
Black British sportsmen
English Football League players
Scottish Football League players
Association football midfielders
Aston Villa F.C. non-playing staff